The Gran Premio Nobili Rubinetterie was a single-day road bicycle race held annually in Arona, Italy between 1997 and 2015. It was held primarily as a 1.1 event on the UCI Europe Tour. In 2010 the GP was split in two challenges, Coppa Papà Carlo and Coppa Città di Stresa, but reverted to a single race – on the route of the Coppa Città di Stresa – in 2012.

Winners

As a stand-alone race

As individual challenge races

Coppa Papà Carlo

Coppa Città di Stresa

Notes

References

External links
Official site 

 
UCI Europe Tour races
Cycle races in Italy
Recurring sporting events established in 1997
1997 establishments in Italy
Recurring sporting events disestablished in 2015
2015 disestablishments in Italy